Sloboda is a rural locality (a selo) in Bichursky District, Republic of Buryatia, Russia. The population was 556 as of 2010. There are 5 streets.

Geography 
Sloboda is located 27 km east of Bichura (the district's administrative centre) by road. Poselye is the nearest rural locality.

References 

Rural localities in Bichursky District